Vigorito is a surname. Notable people with the surname include:

Joseph P. Vigorito (1918–2003), American politician
Mauro Vigorito (born 1990), Italian footballer
Tony Vigorito, American writer
Tommy Vigorito (born 1959), American football player
Tony Vigorito Logoscode, UK Artist, Musician, Business, Other. www.logoscode.com

See also
Stadio Ciro Vigorito, sports venue in Italy